Mandarin Oriental, Munich is located in Munich’s Old Town near shopping along Maximilianstrasse and the famous brewery Hofbräuhaus.  The building that houses Mandarin Oriental, Munich was originally constructed in 1880 and served as the city’s opera house.  In 1990, the building was converted to hotel use and was eventually purchased by Mandarin Oriental Hotel Group in 2000. In 2015 the hotel has undergone an extensive refurbishment of its public areas an opened the new restaurant Matsuhisa, Munich the Bar31 as well as a new lobby lounge in November 2015.

Description
The building that now houses Mandarin Oriental, Munich was constructed in 1880 to serve as the city’s opera house.  It was not until 1990 that the Neo-Renaissance building was converted to a hotel, the Hotel Rafael Munich, by hotelier Georg Rafael. It was then purchased by Mandarin Oriental Hotel Group 10 years later.  During one of the restoration projects, the building’s foundations were found to encompass part of the Medieval city wall, a section of which can still be seen in the hotel’s cellar. Mandarin Oriental, Munich, a 2011 selection for Conde Nast Traveler’s (USA) Gold List, underwent a substantial renovation of its 48 guest rooms and 25 suites in 2007, followed by an extensive refurbishment of the hotel's public area in 2015.   

There are four restaurants and bars at Mandarin Oriental, Munich.  Most notable of these is the Restaurant Matsuhisa, Munich, which serves Japanese-Peruvian cuisine.

See also 
Mandarin Oriental, Barcelona
Mandarin Oriental, Paris
Mandarin Oriental, Hong Kong
Mandarin Oriental Hyde Park, London
Mandarin Oriental, Miami
Mandarin Oriental, New York
Mandarin Oriental, Tokyo
Mandarin Oriental, Singapore
Mandarin Oriental, Sanya
Mandarin Oriental, Chengdu
 List of hotels in Germany

References

Mandarin Oriental Hotel Group
Hotel buildings completed in 1880
1990 establishments in Germany
Hotels established in 1990
1880 establishments in Germany
Hotels in Munich